USS Lucid may refer to the following ships of the United States Navy:

 , was launched 5 June 1943 and transferred to China 28 August 1945
 , was launched 14 November 1953, sold to private owners 1 November 1976, and in refurbishment as a museum ship in Stockton, California since 15 March 2012. 

United States Navy ship names